Garth Lee (born 30 September 1943) is an English footballer, who played as a winger in the Football League for Chester.

References

Chester City F.C. players
Association football wingers
Sheffield United F.C. players
New Brighton A.F.C. players
English Football League players
Footballers from Sheffield
1943 births
Living people
English footballers